John Lennon Anthology is a four-CD box set of home demos, studio outtakes and other previously unreleased material recorded by John Lennon over the course of his solo career from "Give Peace a Chance" in 1969 up until the 1980 sessions for Double Fantasy and Milk and Honey.

The anthology was divided by its compiler and co-producer, Yoko Ono, into four discs representing four eras in Lennon's solo career: "Ascot", "New York City", "The Lost Weekend" and "Dakota".

John Lennon Anthology reached number 62 in the United Kingdom and number 99 in the United States, where it went gold.

A one-disc distillation of the highlights of the box set was released as Wonsaponatime. Many of the tracks were edited down from their versions on John Lennon Anthology. Wonsaponatime failed to reach the US charts but peaked at number 76 in the UK.

Track listing
All songs were written by John Lennon, except where noted.

Disc 1 (Ascot)
"Working Class Hero" – 4:19
"God" – 3:32
 Tracks 1 & 2 taken from 8-track John Lennon/Plastic Ono Band sessions (1970)
"I Found Out" – 3:47
 1970 home recording
"Hold On" – 0:43
"Isolation" – 3:46
"Love" – 2:43
"Mother" – 3:49
"Remember" – 2:44
 Tracks 4–8 taken from 8-track John Lennon/Plastic Ono Band sessions (1970)
"Imagine (take 1)" (John Lennon/Yoko Ono) – 3:21
 From 8-track Imagine sessions (1971)
"'Fortunately'" – 0:19
 Excerpted from BBC documentary 24 Hours: The World of John and Yoko (1969)
"Baby Please Don't Go" (Walter Ward) – 4:04
"Oh My Love" (Lennon/Ono) – 2:53
"Jealous Guy" – 4:10
 Tracks 11–13 taken from 8-track Imagine sessions (1971)
"Maggie Mae" (Trad. Arr. John Lennon/Paul McCartney/George Harrison/Richard Starkey) – 0:52
 1979 home recording
"How Do You Sleep?" – 5:20
 From 8-track Imagine sessions (1971)
"God Save Oz" (Lennon/Ono) – 3:27
 From 8-track master for Bill Elliott and the Elastic Oz Band (1971)
"Do the Oz" (Lennon/Ono) – 3:08
 From original 2-track master single mix (1971)
"I Don't Want to Be a Soldier" – 5:20
 From 8-track Imagine sessions (1971)
"Give Peace a Chance" – 1:52
 From 4-track rehearsal tapes prior to master recording (1969)
"Look at Me" – 2:50
"Long Lost John" (Trad Arr. John Lennon) – 2:14
 Tracks 20 & 21 taken from 8-track John Lennon/Plastic Ono Band sessions (1970)

Disc 2 (New York City)
"New York City" – 0:55
 Home recording (1971)
"Attica State" (live) (Lennon/Ono) – 4:25
"Imagine" (live) – 3:11
 Track 2 & 3 taken from a live performance at the Apollo (1971)
"Bring on the Lucie (Freeda Peeple)" – 4:07
 From 16-track Mind Games sessions (1973)
"Woman Is the Nigger of the World" (Lennon/Ono) – 0:39
 Home recording (1971)
"Geraldo Rivera – One to One Concert" – 0:39
"Woman Is the Nigger of the World" (live) (Lennon/Ono) – 5:14
"It's So Hard" (live) – 3:09
"Come Together" (live) (John Lennon/Paul McCartney) – 4:19
 Tracks 6–9 taken from a live performance at One to One concert (1972)
"Happy Xmas" (Ono/Lennon) – 3:32
 Rough mix (1971)
"The Luck of the Irish" (live) (Lennon/Ono) – 3:42
"John Sinclair" (live) – 3:43
 Tracks 11 & 12 taken from John Sinclair benefit concert (1971)
"The David Frost Show" – 0:52
 TV audio (1971)
"Mind Games (I Promise)" – 1:01
"Mind Games (Make Love, Not War)" – 1:14
 Tracks 14 & 15 taken from home recording (1970)
"One Day (At a Time)" – 3:13
 From 16-track Mind Games sessions (1973)
"I Know (I Know)" – 3:13
 Home recording (1973)
"I'm the Greatest" – 3:37
 From 16-track rehearsals. The song was later given to Ringo Starr (1973)
"Goodnight Vienna" – 2:42
 From 16-track demo. The song was later given to Ringo (1974)
"Jerry Lewis Telethon" – 1:59
 TV audio (1972)
"' A Kiss Is Just a Kiss '" (Herman Hupfeld) – 0:11
 Home vignette (1976)
"Real Love" – 4:13
 Piano demo (1979)
"You Are Here" – 4:55
 From 16-track Mind Games sessions (1973)

Disc 3 (The Lost Weekend)
"What You Got" – 1:14
 Home recording (1974)
"Nobody Loves You (When You're Down and Out)" – 5:38
 From 16-track Walls and Bridges sessions (1974)
"Whatever Gets You thru the Night (home)" – 0:38
 Home recording (1974)
"Whatever Gets You thru the Night (studio)" – 3:33
"Yesterday (parody)" (John Lennon/Paul McCartney) – 0:33
 Tracks 4 & 5 taken from 16-track Walls and Bridges sessions (1974)
"Be-Bop-A-Lula" (Gene Vincent/Tex Davis) – 2:52
"Rip It Up/Ready Teddy" (Robert Blackwell/John Marascalco) – 2:32
 Tracks 6 & 7 taken from 16-track Rock 'n' Roll sessions (1974)
"Scared" – 5:02
"Steel and Glass" – 4:46
"Surprise, Surprise (Sweet Bird of Paradox)" – 2:58
"Bless You" – 4:15
"Going Down on Love" – 0:54
"Move Over Ms. L" – 3:10
"Ain't She Sweet" (Yellen/Ager) – 0:28
 Tracks 8–14 taken from 16-track Walls and Bridges sessions (1974)
"Slippin' and Slidin'" (Richard Penniman/Bocage/Collins/Smith) – 2:28
"Peggy Sue" (Jerry Allison/Buddy Holly/Norman Petty) – 1:18
"Bring It On Home to Me/Send Me Some Lovin'" (Sam Cooke)/(John Marascalco, Leo Price) – 3:50
 Tracks 15–17 taken from 16-track Rock 'n' Roll sessions (1974)
"Phil and John 1" – 2:13
"Phil and John 2" – 2:00
"Phil and John 3" – 0:54
"'When in Doubt, Fuck It'" – 0:09
"Be My Baby" (Phil Spector/Ellie Greenwich/Jeff Barry) – 4:32
 Tracks 18–22 taken from 16-track Rock 'n' Roll sessions (1973)
"Stranger's Room" – 3:17
 Home recording (1980)
"Old Dirt Road" (John Lennon/Harry Nilsson) – 3:54
 From 16-track Walls and Bridges sessions (1974)

Disc 4 (Dakota)
"I'm Losing You" – 4:06
 From 16-track Double Fantasy/Milk and Honey sessions (1980)
"Sean's 'Little Help'" – 0:57
 Home recording (1979)
"Serve Yourself" – 3:47
"My Life" – 2:36
 Tracks 3–4 Home recordings (1980)
"Nobody Told Me" – 3:31
 From 16-track Double Fantasy/Milk and Honey sessions (1980)
"Life Begins at 40" – 2:23
 Home recording (1980)
"I Don't Wanna Face It" – 3:31
 Taken from 16-track Double Fantasy/Milk and Honey sessions (1980)
"Woman" – 4:01
 Home recording (1980)
"Dear Yoko" – 2:33
 From 16-track Double Fantasy/Milk and Honey sessions (1980)
"Watching the Wheels" – 3:04
 Home recording (1980)
"I'm Stepping Out" – 4:19
 From 16-track Double Fantasy/Milk and Honey sessions (1980)
"Borrowed Time" – 3:57
"The Rishi Kesh Song" – 2:26
 Tracks 12 & 13 from home recordings (1980)
"Sean's 'Loud'" – 0:33
 Home recording (1979)
"Beautiful Boy" – 4:11
 From 16-track Double Fantasy/Milk and Honey sessions (1980)
"Mr. Hyde's Gone (Don't Be Afraid)" – 2:41
 Home recording (1980)
"Only You" (Ande Rand/Buck Ram) – 3:24
 From 16-track studio work tape from the Ringo Starr Goodnight Vienna sessions (1974)
"Grow Old with Me" – 3:18
 Home recording (1980) with orchestration by George Martin. Original demo appears on Milk and Honey.
"Dear John" – 2:13
 Home recording (1980)
"The Great Wok" – 3:13
 Home recording (1979)
"Mucho Mungo" – 1:24
 Home recording (1976)
"Satire 1" – 2:20
"Satire 2" – 4:34
"Satire 3" – 0:45
"Sean's "In the Sky" " – 1:22
"It's Real" – 1:05
 Tracks 22–26 taken from home recordings (1979)

Wonsaponatime

Tracklisting
All songs written by Lennon, except where noted.

"I'm Losing You" – 3:56
"Working Class Hero" – 3:58
"God" – 3:16
"How Do You Sleep?" – 5:00
"Imagine" (Lennon/Ono) – 3:05
"Baby Please Don't Go" (Walter Ward) – 4:04
"Oh My Love" ((Lennon/Ono) – 2:43
"God Save Oz" (Lennon/Ono) – 3:20
"I Found Out" – 3:47
"Woman Is the Nigger of the World" (live) – 5:14
"'A Kiss Is Just A Kiss'" (Herman Hupfeld) – 0:11
"Be-Bop-A-Lula" (Gene Vincent/T. Davis) – 2:40
"Rip It Up/Reddy Teddy" (Blackwell/Marascalo) – 2:26
"What You Got" – 1:14
"Nobody Loves You (When You're Down and Out)" – 5:02
"I Don't Wanna Face It" – 3:31
"Real Love" – 4:07
"Only You" (Buck Ram/Ande Rand) – 3:24
"Grow Old with Me" – 3:18
"Sean's "In The Sky" " – 1:22 - Spoken Words
"Serve Yourself" – 3:47

Certifications

References

1998 compilation albums
Capitol Records compilation albums
Compilation albums published posthumously
EMI Records compilation albums
John Lennon compilation albums
Demo albums
Albums recorded in a home studio